Maipú Partido is a partido in the east-central part of Buenos Aires Province in Argentina.

Economy
The economy of Maipú Partido is dominated by agriculture, the mainstays of the agricultural production being arable crops, cattle, and dairy products.

Settlements
Maipú (capital)
Las Armas 
Monsalvo
Santo Domingo 
Segurola

References

External links

 

1878 establishments in Argentina
Partidos of Buenos Aires Province